Riythvika Panneerselvam also well known as Riythvika, is an Indian actress who appears in supporting roles in Tamil films. In 2018, she won the Tamil reality television show, Bigg Boss Tamil season 2. In all South Indian languages, she is the second one to win the title, to date as a woman.

In 2014, she won Filmfare Award for Best Supporting Actress – Tamil for her outstanding performance in the 2014 film Madras and was nominated for SIIMA Award for Best Actress in a Supporting Role and  Vijay Award for Best Supporting Actress.

Career

2013–2014: Early life and career beginnings 
Riythvika studied at Justice Basheer Ahmed Sayeed College For Women (SIET) in Teynampet, Chennai. She has stated that she had always dreamt of acting in films and that she used to act out scenes and reel out dialogues from films as a child. While studying at SIET, she acted in a number of short films and sent her photos to film PROs, trying for an entry into the cinema industry.

2014–2016: Breakthrough with Madras and  widespread success 
During that period, director Bala was casting for his next project, Paradesi (2013), an adaptation of the English novel Red Tea (1969), which delves into the plight of tea plantation workers in the Madras Presidency during the British Raj. After going through a couple of auditions, she was selected to play the role of Karuthakanni, a young woman who gets tortured and sexually exploited in the plantations. She went on to act in Vikraman's romance film Ninaithathu Yaaro (2014) before being chosen by Pa. Ranjith for Madras (2014) to play a pivotal supporting role opposite Kalaiyarasan. Her portrayal of a North Chennai girl was lauded by critics and she won the Filmfare Award for Best Supporting Actress – Tamil besides several other nominations.

The success of Madras prompted Ranjith and other film-makers to often cast her as a girl from a lower socio-economic background. In this trend, she notably appeared as a drug addict in Kabali (2016), and as a prostitute in Iru Mugan (2016),Torchlight (2018) and Sigai (2019). In other assignments during the period, she featured as a liberal radio jockey in Oru Naal Koothu (2016), and as a ghost in the horror comedy, Onaaigal Jakkiradhai (2018).

2018: Bigg Boss 2 and Torchlight 
In 2018, Riythvika appeared in the reality show  Bigg Boss Tamil season 2 as a contestant, She won peoples hearts and emerged as the winner of the 2nd season in the franchise. She is up to the date the only female to ever win Bigg Boss Tamil in history. She also appeared in the film Torchlight (2018) playing a crucial role in the film alongside actress Sadha.

2019–Present: Film comeback 
She is currently working on projects including Odavum Mudiyathu Oliyavum Mudiyathu, and an untitled biopic of actor-politician MGR, where she essays the role of Janaki Ramachandran. For the latter role, Riythvika carefully studied the habits and behaviour of Janaki, including by watching her old films.

Filmography

All films are in Tamil, unless otherwise noted.

Films

Television

Web series

References

External links
 

Living people
Actresses in Tamil cinema
Actresses from Chennai
Indian film actresses
21st-century Indian actresses
Big Brother (franchise) winners
Year of birth missing (living people)
Bigg Boss (Tamil TV series) contestants